Go First Dice are a set of four dodecahedral dice in which, when rolled together, each die has an equal chance of showing the highest number, the second highest number, and so on. The dice are intended for fairly deciding the order of play in, for example, a four-player board game. Any subset of dice taken from the set and rolled together also have the same properties. The numbers on the set of dice go from 1 to 48, with each number appearing exactly once, so that no ties are possible.

References

Dice